A nursing father is a male parent who provides primary care for an infant. This term applies to many different types of species.

This concept regarding humans is mostly an emerging phenomenon of the 21st century. It is considered a consequence of the changing perceptions of the role of family and women in the Western world. A nursing father may take on the roles which have been traditionally or stereotypically assigned to women. This includes feeding and bathing the infant, and providing all other necessities for the baby.

References

Human development
Child care
Fatherhood